Thrissur R. Vaidyanatha Bhagavathar is a Carnatic vocalist from Thrissur city, Kerala. He studied music from Thanjavur. His guru was Swamimalai Janakiraman and Umayalpuram Venkatraman.

References

Living people
Male Carnatic singers
Carnatic singers
Singers from Thrissur
People from Irinjalakuda
21st-century Indian male classical singers
Year of birth missing (living people)